Merano or Meran is a city and comune in South Tyrol, northern Italy.

In the past, the city has been a popular place of residence for several scientists, literary people, and artists, including Franz Kafka, Ezra Pound, Paul Lazarsfeld, and also Empress Elisabeth of Austria, who appreciated its mild climate.

Name
Both the Italian and the German names for the city are used in English. The official name of the municipality (comune) is Comune di Merano in Italian and Stadtgemeinde Meran in German (both are in official use).

History
In 17th-century Latin, the city was called Meranum. Other archaic names are Mairania (from 857 AD) and an der Meran (from the 15th century).

Origin

The area has been inhabited since the third millennium BC, as shown by the presence of menhirs and other findings. The story of the city proper began in 15 BC when the Romans occupied the Adige valley founding a road station, Statio Maiensis.

The settlement was first mentioned in an 857 deed as Mairania. The Counts at Castle Tyrol elevated Merano to the status of a city during the 13th century and made it the capital of their County of Tyrol. After the county had been handed over to the Habsburg dynasty in 1363 upon the abdication of Margaret, Countess of Tyrol, in 1420 Duke Friedrich IV of Austria moved the Tyrolean court to Innsbruck. Though Merano remained the official capital until 1848, it subsequently lost its predominant position and almost all its importance as an economic hub across the roads connecting Italy and Germany. The important mint was also moved to Hall in 1477.

Modern history
The Tyrolean Rebellion of 1809 against the French occupation drew attention again to Merano. In that year, on the Küchelberg above the city, a peasants' army eked out a victory against the united French and Bavarian forces before their revolt was finally crushed. After World War I, under the Treaty of Saint-Germain-en-Laye Merano became part of the Kingdom of Italy with the rest of the southern part of the former Cisleithanian crown land of Tyrol.

During the Nazi occupation of the region in 1943–5, the Meranese Jewish population was almost completely deported and murdered within concentration camps.

Coat of arms
The city's coat of arms depicts the red Tyrolean eagle sitting on a wall with four pieces of Ghibelline battlements and three arches that symbolize the city. The arms is known from the 14th century and the oldest seal dates from 1353, while the coloured one since 1390. In a 1759 image, the eagle is represented with a crown and a green wreath of honour. After World War I and the annexation of the city from Austria-Hungary to Italy, it was a new coat of arms given in 1928, which looked similar to the old one, but with five parts of the battlements and the arches with the gates opened on a lawn of shamrock. A mural crown was placed above the shield. The five parts of the battlement represented the districts of Maia Bassa, Merano (old city), Maia Alta, and Quarazze and Avelengo, which were incorporated into the city by the Italian fascists. After World War II, Avelengo became independent again and the historical coat of arms was restored.

Main sights

Among the city's landmarks are the medieval city gates such as the Vinschgauer Tor, Passeirer Tor, and the Bozener Tor. Also belonging to the fortifications is the medieval Ortenstein tower, popularly called Pulverturm (lit. "powder tower").

The main churches are the Gothic St. Nicholas' Church and the St. Barbara's Chapel, both dating to the 15th century. Also dating to this period is the Princely Castle (Landesfürstliche Burg), which was a residence of Archduke Sigismund of Austria.

The Steinerner Steg stone bridge crosses the Passer river and dates to the 17th century.

The city saw further development as it became increasingly popular as a spa resort, especially after Empress Elisabeth of Austria started visiting. Dating from the 19th century are the Civic Theatre, the Kurhaus and the Empress Elisabeth Park. Also famous are the arched Wandelhalle promenades along the river.

After the annexation of the city by Italy in 1919, the Fascist authorities constructed the new city hall in the 1920s.

Outside the city is Trauttmansdorff Castle and its gardens. Located there is the Museum of Tourism, which was opened in the spring of 2003 and shows the historical development of tourism in the province. Tirol Castle is also close by.

Climate
Merano is on the borderline between several climates. Officially, it has an oceanic climate (Cfb). However, it is close to being humid subtropical (Cfa) due to the mean temperature in July being just under 22 °C; even on those terms, the overnight lows in the winter bring the mean temperatures low enough for the city as a whole to have continental (Dfa/Dfb) influences with more distinct seasons.

The average daily temperatures in summer in Merano lie between 27 and 30 °C, while at night temperatures usually drop to between 12 and 15 °C. The average daily temperatures in winter lie between 6 and 10 °C, while at night temperatures usually drop to between -4 and -2 °C. The wettest month is August with 96 mm, while the driest is February with only 25 mm. This data was measured at the weather station Merano/Quarazze at an altitude of 333 metres between 1983 and 2017.

Culture

Food
The area is well known for its wines, both white and red, and vineyards extend right into the city. The local wine, Meraner Leiten (Meranese di collina), is a light red wine, best drunk young. There are also extensive orchards, and apples are exported throughout Europe. The Forst Brewery on the edge of the city produces a popular range of beers, sold throughout Italy and Europe.

Cultural events

Merano organizes the following events every year.
 Asfaltart
 Festival MeranOJazz
 Meraner Musikwochen
 Christmas market Merano
 Merano WineFestival

People

Early times
 Arbeo of Freising (died 784), early medieval author and bishop
 Johann Baptista Ruffini (1672–1749), salt trader

19th C
 Pius Zingerle (1801–1881), an Austrian Orientalist.
 Ludwig Freiherr von und zu der Tann-Rathsamhausen (1815–1881 in Meran), a Bavarian general.
 Oskar Freiherr von Redwitz (1823–1891), a German poet, lived in Merano from 1872.
 Ignaz Vincenz Zingerle (1825–1892), poet and scholar.
 Peretz Smolenskin (1842–1885 in Meran), a Russian-born Zionist and Hebrew writer.
 Hermann von Tappeiner (1847–1927), physician and pharmacologist, used photodynamic therapy
 Sir Rudolf Carl von Slatin (1857–1932), soldier and Inspector General of Sudan
 Ferdinand Behrens (1862-1925), painter and city portraitist
 Leo Putz (1869–1940), Tyrolean painter
 Prince Emmanuel, Duke of Vendome (1872–1931), a French royal from the House of Orléans 
 Prince Francis Joseph of Braganza (1879–1919), officer in the Austro-Hungarian Army and victim of sex scandals and swindles
 Richard Steidle (1881–1940 in Buchenwald), lawyer, leader of the paramilitary Heimwehr in Tyrol
 Erna Ellmenreich (1885–1976), operatic soprano, a member of the Staatstheater Stuttgart
 Oswald Menghin (1888–1973), university professor, prehistorians, minister of education
 Heinz von Perckhammer (1895–1965), photographer, known for his Chinese nudes
 Ludwig Bemelmans (1898–1962), American writer and illustrator of children's books

20th C
 Hans Andersag (1902–1955), scientist, discovered Chloroquine, a malaria drug
 Anton Malloth (1912–2002), supervisor at Theresienstadt concentration camp 
 Silvius Magnago (1914–2010), politician, South Tyrolean governor, father of the autonomy of South Tyrol
 Annelies Reinhold (1917–2007), film actress
 Bargil Pixner (1921–2002), a Benedictine monk, Biblical scholar and archaeologist
 Norbert Untersteiner (1926–2012), pioneer of modern polar science research
 Alberto Lizzio (1926-1999), fictitious conductor of inexpensive, mass market, classical recordings
 Irène Galter (1931–2018), actress
 Maria Bertolini (1931-2022), politician
 Arnaldo Di Benedetto, (born 1940), literary critic and professor
 Franco D'Andrea (born 1941), jazz pianist
 Lino Capolicchio (1943–2022), actor, screenwriter and film director
 Reinhold Messner (born 1944), Italian mountaineer, adventurer, explorer, and author
 Cuno Tarfusser (born 1954), judge at the International Criminal Court
 Gloria Guida (born 1955), Italian-speaking actress
 Rudolf Stingel (born 1956), artist
 Ferdinand Gamper (1957–1996), serial killer
 Luca Dipierro (born 1973), illustrator and animator

Sport
 Norberto Oberburger (born 1960), retired heavyweight weightlifter, gold medallist at the 1984 Summer Olympics 
 Edith Gufler (born 1962), former sport shooter, silver medallist at the 1984 Summer Olympics 
 Guenther Steiner (born 1965), motorsports engineer and team principal of Haas F1 Team 
 Armin Zöggeler (born 1974), luge champion with six Olympic medals and nine world championship golds
 Dominik Paris (born 1989), alpine skier, gold and silver medallist in World Championships
 Daniel Frank (born 1994), ice hockey player
 Daniel Grassl (born 2002), figure skater at the 2022 Winter Olympics, silver medalist at the 2022 European Figure Skating Championships

Economy

Merano is a popular tourist destination especially for Germans and Italians. In the summer, there are concerts on the promenade almost daily, and there are fine walks around the city and in the surrounding hills, not least "Merano 2000", where there is also skiing in winter. The city is reachable with the railway Bolzano-Merano, which continues to the Vinschgau Railway Merano-Malles.

Society
According to the 2011 census, 50.47% of the resident population spoke German as mother language, 49.06% Italian, and 0.47% Ladin.

Sport
A chess opening, the Merano Variation of the Semi-Slav Defense, is named after the city, from its successful use by Akiba Rubinstein against Ernst Grünfeld during a tournament held in the city in 1924. In 1981, the World Chess Championship match between Anatoly Karpov and Victor Korchnoi was held in Merano. The first act of the musical Chess also has a world chess championship match set in Merano, and features a song entitled "Merano", which includes the line, "rosy-cheeked Merano, flourishing to a fault".

The city's handball team, is one of the most successful in Italy, winning the scudetto in 2005. The ice hockey team won two national championships but currently plays in the second division, Serie B.

Each September, the Gran Premio Merano takes place in the Maia Racecourse; this is the most famous Italian Steeplechase.

Merano hosted the 1953, 1971 and 1983 ICF Canoe Slalom World Championships. This is where the well known 'Merano' move was created due to a tricky upstream gate. This move is now used and well known by many slalom paddlers worldwide.

Twin towns and sister cities
The twin towns and sister cities are:
  Salzburg, Austria

References

Further reading

External links

 
 
 Meran.eu, Homepage of the Tourism Authority

 
Spa towns in Italy
Roman fortifications in Raetia